Henry Williams may refer to:

Politicians 
Henry Williams (activist) (born 2000), chief of staff of the Mike Gravel 2020 presidential campaign
Henry Williams (MP for Northamptonshire) (died 1558), Member of Parliament (MP) for Northamptonshire
Henry Williams (alias Cromwell) (died 1604), MP for Huntingdon
Henry Williams (died 1636) (c. 1579–1636), English politician who sat in the House of Commons at various times between 1601 and 1624
Henry Williams (MP for Radnorshire), Welsh politician who sat in the House of Commons between 1654 and 1659
Sir Henry Williams, 2nd Baronet (1635–1666), British Member of Parliament for Brecon and Breconshire
Henry Williams (Massachusetts politician) (1805–1887), United States Representative from Massachusetts
Henry Williams (New Zealand politician) (1823–1907), member of the New Zealand Legislative Council
Henry Williams (Victorian politician) (died 1910), Australian politician
Henry D. Williams (1893–1934), American politician from New York
Henry H. Williams (1813–1890), American politician from Iowa
Henry Roberts Williams (1848–1935), Australian politician
Henry Williams (Queensland politician) (1832–1871), Member of the Queensland Legislative Assembly

Athletes 
Henry L. Williams (1869–1931), American college football player and coach
Henry Williams (baseball) (1895–death unknown), American Negro leagues baseball player
Henry Williams Jr. (1917–2002), American professional golfer
Gizmo Williams (Henry L. Williams, born 1962), American player in the Canadian Football League
Henry Williams (cricketer) (born 1967), South African cricketer
Henry Williams (basketball) (1970–2018), American basketball player
Henry Williams (American football) (born 1956), former professional American football player

Others
Henry Williams (missionary) (1792–1867), English missionary to New Zealand
Henry Harvey Williams (1917–2004), Governor-General of Saint Vincent and the Grenadines
Henry Horace Williams (1858–1940), American philosopher and university professor
Henry Smith Williams (1863–1943), American medical doctor and author
Henry Williams (bishop) (1872–1961), English Anglican bishop
Henry Williams (Medal of Honor) (1834–1917), United States Navy seaman who received the Medal of Honor
Henry Williams (soldier) (1918-1942), United States Army private killed by a bus driver in Mobile, Alabama
Henry Shaler Williams (1847–1918), American geologist
Henry Sylvester Williams (1869–1911), lawyer, councillor and writer
Rubberlegs Williams (Henry Williams, 1907–1962), American blues/jazz singer and dancer
Henry Williams (Casualty), a fictional character from the BBC television drama Casualty, played by Tom Chadbon
Henry Williams (priest) (fl. 1510s - 1550s), Canon of Windsor
Henry F. Williams (1813–c. 1903), African-American composer
Henry Howell Williams (1796–1873), American merchant
 Henry Williams, the plaintiff of Williams v. Mississippi

See also
Harry Williams (disambiguation)
Henry Williams Baker (1821–1877), hymn writer